Daru Airport  is an airport serving Daru, the capital of the Western Province in Papua New Guinea.

The airfield was constructed before or during World War II. During the war it was used as a refuelling stop by Allied fighter aircraft. The Australian Army rebuilt the airport in 1965.  The airport is served by PNG Air and Air Niugini with access to destinations including the national capital, Port Moresby.

Airlines and destinations

References

External links
 

Airports in Papua New Guinea
Western Province (Papua New Guinea)